Gandabeh may refer to:

Gandabeh, Dowreh
Gandabeh, Khorramabad
Gandabeh, Azna
Gandabeh, Robat